Mac OS Devanagari is a character set developed by Apple Inc., based on IS 13194:1991 (ISCII-91).

Character set 

Byte pairs and ISCII-related features are described in the mapping file. For more information on the INV character, see Indian Script Code for Information Interchange § Special code points.

References 

Devanagari
Devanagari